Liangshaoyikuan, literally "two fewers, one leniency", was a Chinese government policy of giving leniency in charges and sentences with regard to minorities as compared to Han for the same criminal offenses. The policy was enacted in 1984 by Peng Zhen and Hu Yaobang. On July 9, 2010, a statement jointly published by the Publicity Department of the Chinese Communist Party, State Ethnic Affairs Commission, and United Front Work Department suggested that "everyone should be equal before the law, and criminals should be punished regardless of their ethnicity". However, they do not have the legal authority to challenge a policy implemented by the Central Committee of the Chinese Communist Party, a higher authority; the policy has thus never been officially repealed.

Background
In November 1931, the policy of the treatment toward ethnic minorities by the Chinese Communist Party was formulated in Ruijin, Jiangxi Province, then capital of the Chinese Soviet Republic. On September 29, 1949, with communist control over most of China, the formal policy toward ethnic minorities for the future People's Republic of China was formulated. Over time, the policy was believed to be the source of tensions between the Han majority and ethnic minorities, as well as cover for ethnic minority separatists. At the time of its abolition, the policy was heavily opposed by prominent members of the ethnic minorities, who believed it encouraged criminal activity among young members of ethnic minority groups.

Impact

The policy is controversial in the sense of promoting social inequality.

See also
Hu Yaobang
Zhonghua minzu
Ethnic minorities in China
Social equality
Reverse discrimination

References

External links
 一个兵团二代的网文：告诉你真实的乌鲁木齐

Chinese law